Hernán Martín Maisterra  (born 30 June 1972, in Buenos Aires) is a retired Argentine footballer who played for a number of clubs in Argentina and other Latin American countries, including Club Atlético Platense, Club Atlético River Plate and Club León. He currently works as the manager of Comisión de Actividades Infantiles in the Argentine 2nd division.

External links
 Argentine Primera statistics  
 

1972 births
Living people
Argentine footballers
Footballers from Buenos Aires
Club Atlético Platense footballers
Club Atlético River Plate footballers
Club Atlético Los Andes footballers
Godoy Cruz Antonio Tomba footballers
The Strongest players
Club León footballers
Argentine Primera División players
Expatriate footballers in Mexico
Expatriate footballers in Bolivia
Argentine expatriate footballers
Argentine expatriate sportspeople in Mexico
Argentine expatriate sportspeople in Bolivia
Argentine football managers
Comisión de Actividades Infantiles managers
Association football midfielders